ATP-dependent RNA helicase DDX3X is an enzyme that in humans is encoded by the DDX3X gene.

Function 

DEAD box proteins, characterized by the conserved motif Asp-Glu-Ala-Asp (DEAD), are putative RNA helicases. They are implicated in a number of cellular processes involving alteration of RNA secondary structure such as translation initiation, nuclear and mitochondrial splicing, and ribosome and spliceosome assembly. Based on their distribution patterns, some members of this family are believed to be involved in embryogenesis, spermatogenesis, and cellular growth and division. This gene encodes a DEAD box protein, which interacts specifically with hepatitis C virus core protein resulting a change in intracellular location. This gene has a homolog located in the nonrecombining region of the Y chromosome. The protein sequence is 91% identical between this gene and the Y-linked homolog.

Sub-cellular trafficking 
DDX3X performs its functions in the cell nucleus and cytoplasm, exiting the nucleus via the exportin-1/CRM1 nuclear export pathway. It was initially reported that the DDX3X helicase domain was necessary for this interaction, while the canonical features of the trafficking pathway, namely the presence of a nuclear export signal (NES) on DDX3X and Ran-GTP binding to exportin-1, were dispensable. DDX3X binding to, and trafficking by, exportin-1 has since been shown not to require the DDX3X helicase domain and be explicitly NES- and Ran-GTP-dependent.

Role in cancer 

DDX3X is involved in many different types of cancer. For example, it is abnormally expressed in breast epithelial cancer cells in which its expression is activated by HIF1A during hypoxia. Increased expression of DDX3X by HIF1A in hypoxia is initiated by the direct binding of HIF1A to the HIF1A response element, as verified with chromatin immunoprecipitation and luciferase reporter assay. Since the expression of DDX3X is affected by the activity of HIF1A, the co-localization of these proteins has also been demonstrated in MDA-MB-231 xenograft tumor samples.

In HeLa cells DDX3X is reported to control cell cycle progression through Cyclin E1. More specifically, DDX3X was shown to directly bind to the 5´ UTR of Cyclin E1 and thereby facilitating the translation of the protein. Increased protein levels of Cyclin E1 was demonstrated to mediate the transition of S phase entry.

Melanoma survival, migration and proliferation is affected by DDX3X activity. Melanoma cells with low DDX3X expression exhibit a high migratory capacity, low proliferation rate and reduced vemurafenib sensitivity. While high DDX3X expressing cells are drug sensitive, more proliferative and less migratory. These phenotypes can be explained by the translational effects on the melanoma transcription factor MITF. The 5' UTR of the MITF mRNA contains a complex RNA regulon (IRES) that is bound and activated by DDX3X. Activation of the IRES leads to translation of the MITF mRNA. Mice injected with melanoma cells with a deleted IRES display more aggressive tumor progression including increased lung metastasis. Interestingly, the DDX3X in melanoma is affected by vemurafenib via an undiscovered mechanism. It is unknown how DDX3X is downregulated by the presence of vemurafenib. However, reduced levels of DDX3X during drug treatment explains the development of drug resistant cells frequently detected with low MITF expression.

Clinical significance 

Mutations of the DDX3X gene are associated with medulloblastoma. In melanoma the low expression of the gene is linked to a poor distant metastasis free survival. In addition, the mRNA level of DDX3X is lower in matched post-relapse melanoma biopsies for patients receiving vemurafenib and in progressing tumors.

Mutations of the DDX3X gene also cause DDX3X syndrome, which affects predominantly females and presents with developmental delay or disability, autism, ADHD, and low muscle tone.

See also 

Eukaryotic translation
DExD/H box proteins
DHX29

References

Further reading